Platanthera deflexilabella is a species of plant in the family Orchidaceae. It is endemic to Sichuan Province of China.

References

Endemic orchids of China
Orchids of Sichuan
deflexilabella
Vulnerable plants
Taxonomy articles created by Polbot